The Maltese Clue is an adventure for fantasy role-playing games published by Judges Guild in 1979.

Contents
The Maltese Clue is a tournament scenario for midlevel characters with a detective angle to it, inspired by The Maltese Falcon.  The characters are mostly members of a thieves' guild; the castle they must penetrate is based on Hedingham Castle in England.

Publication history
The Maltese Clue was written by Paul Karczag, with art by Kevin Siembieda, and was published by Judges Guild in 1979 as a 48-page book.

Reception
Patrick Amory reviewed The Maltese Clue for Different Worlds magazine and stated that "If you don't mind AD&D humor this one should be good for several somewhat ludicrous sessions of play."

References

Judges Guild fantasy role-playing game adventures
Role-playing game supplements introduced in 1979